The Monarch of the Glen is a Scottish comic farce novel written by English-born Scottish author Compton Mackenzie and published in 1941. The first in Mackenzie's Highland Novels series, it depicts the life in the fictional Scottish castle of Glenbogle. The television programme Monarch of the Glen is very loosely based on the series.

References
 Linklater, Andro Compton Mackenzie: A Life The Hogarth Press (1992, London)

1941 British novels
Chatto & Windus books
Novels by Compton Mackenzie
Novels set in Highland (council area)
Novels about nobility